Calochortus coeruleus, often misspelled as Calochortus caeruleus,  is a bulbous plant of the lily family. It is known by the common name beavertail grass or blue star tulip.

Description
The plant is endemic to California. It is found only in the North California Coast Ranges, Southern Cascade Range, and Northern Sierra Nevada.

Calochortus coeruleus is a distinctive plant bearing flowers with light blue spade-shaped petals covered in brushlike hairs.

Taxonomy
The botanical name Calochortus caeruleus is not accepted, being an orthographic variant (misspelling) of Calochortus coeruleus. Watson in coining the name in 1875 spelled it "caeruleus" but he also cited Kellogg's 1863 name Cyclobothra coerulea as basionym.

References

External links 

 Calflora database: Calochortus coeruleus (blue star tulip)
 Jepson eFlora (TJM2) Treatment of ''Calochortus coeruleus
Archived: Jepson Manual (TJM93) Treatment of Calochortus coeruleus
USDA Plants Profile for Calochortus coeruleus (beavertail grass)

coeruleus
Endemic flora of California
Flora of the Cascade Range
Flora of the Klamath Mountains
Flora of the Sierra Nevada (United States)
Natural history of the California chaparral and woodlands
Natural history of the California Coast Ranges
Plants described in 1863
Taxa named by Albert Kellogg
Taxa named by Sereno Watson